The 1915–16 Colgate Raiders men's basketball team represented Colgate University during the 1915–16 college men's basketball season. The head coach was Walt Hammond, coaching the Raiders in his third season. The team had finished with a final record of 14–4. The team captain was Don Kennedy.

Schedule

|-

References

Colgate Raiders men's basketball seasons
Colgate
Colgate
Colgate